The year 2004 is the eighth year in the history of M-1 Global, a mixed martial arts promotion based in Russia. In 2004 M-1 Global held 7 events beginning with, M-1 MFC: Mix-fight.

Events list

M-1 Northwest Open Cup

M-1 Northwest Open Cup was an event held on February 21, 2004 in Russia.

Results

M-1 International Fight Night 1

M-1 International Fight Night 1 was an event held on April 10, 2004 in Saint Petersburg, Russia.

Results

M-1 International Fight Night 2

International Fight Night 2 was an event held on May 21, 2004 in Saint Petersburg, Russia.

Results

M-1 Middleweight Russia Cup

M-1 Middleweight Russia Cup was an event held on August 27, 2004 at Conti Hall in Saint Petersburg, Russia.

Results

M-1 Middleweight Grand Prix

M-1 Middleweight Grand Prix was an event held on October 9, 2004 in Saint Petersburg, Russia.

Results

M-1 Heavyweight Russia Cup

M-1 Heavyweight Russia Cup was an event held on November 6, 2004 at Gigant Hall in Saint Petersburg, Russia.

Results

M-1 Heavyweight Grand Prix

M-1 Heavyweight Grand Prix was an event held on December 4, 2004 at the Lujniki Sports Complex in Moscow, Russia.

Results

See also 
 M-1 Global

References

M-1 Global events
2004 in mixed martial arts